Pennington is a borough in Mercer County, in the U.S. state of New Jersey. The borough is located at the cross-roads between the Delaware Valley region to the south and the Raritan Valley region to the north. As of the 2020 United States census, the borough's population was 2,802, an increase of 217 (+8.4%) from the 2010 census count of 2,585, which in turn reflected a decline of 111 (−4.1%) from the 2,696 counted in the 2000 census.

History
According to an 1883 history, "the first name of the village was Queenstown, which was given it in honor of Queen Anne. Later it was by some, in derision of its comparative insignificance, Pennytown, and as early as 1747 it began to be called Pennington." The name "Penington" was already known in the area, as Edward Penington (1667–1701), son of the British Quaker leader Isaac Penington, was appointed by his kinsman William Penn as Surveyor General of Pennsylvania. His father-in-law was a longtime leader, including as Governor, of the province of West Jersey, where Edward married. Henry Gannett attributes the borough's name to colonial governors from the Pennington family.

Pennington was established as a borough by an act of the New Jersey Legislature on January 31, 1890, from portions of Hopewell Township, based on the results of a referendum held on January 21, 1890. It is a dry borough, where alcohol cannot be sold.

Geography
According to the United States Census Bureau, the borough had a total area of 0.96 square miles (2.50 km2), including 0.96 square miles (2.49 km2) of land and <0.01 square miles (0.01 km2) of water (0.31%).

The borough is an independent municipality completely surrounded by Hopewell Township, making it part one of 21 pairs of "doughnut towns" in the state, where one municipality entirely surrounds another.

Climate
According to the Köppen climate classification system, Pennington, New Jersey has a hot-summer, wet all year, humid continental climate (Dfa). Dfa climates are characterized by at least one month having an average mean temperature ≤ 32.0 °F (≤ 0.0 °C), at least four months with an average mean temperature ≥ 50.0 °F (≥ 10.0 °C), at least one month with an average mean temperature ≥ 71.6 °F (≥ 22.0 °C), and no significant precipitation difference between seasons. During the summer months, episodes of extreme heat and humidity can occur with heat index values ≥ 100 °F (≥ 38 °C). On average, the wettest month of the year is July which corresponds with the annual peak in thunderstorm activity. During the winter months, episodes of extreme cold and wind can occur with wind chill values < 0 °F (< −18 °C). The plant hardiness zone at the Pennington Municipal Court is 6b with an average annual extreme minimum air temperature of −0.7 °F (−18.2 °C).

According to the A. W. Kuchler U.S. potential natural vegetation types, Pennington, New Jersey would have an Appalachian Oak (104) vegetation type with an Eastern Hardwood Forest (25) vegetation form.

Demographics

2010 census

The Census Bureau's 2006–2010 American Community Survey showed that (in 2010 inflation-adjusted dollars) median household income was $107,250 (with a margin of error of +/− $18,509) and the median family income was $156,923 (+/− $18,294). Males had a median income of $106,250 (+/− $20,859) versus $76,477 (+/− $25,432) for females. The per capita income for the borough was $56,962 (+/− $6,372). About 6.2% of families and 6.0% of the population were below the poverty line, including 11.2% of those under age 18 and 2.9% of those age 65 or over.

2000 census
As of the 2000 United States census there were 2,696 people, 1,013 households, and 761 families residing in the borough. The population density was 2,801.0 people per square mile (1,084.3/km2). There were 1,040 housing units at an average density of 1,080.5 per square mile (418.3/km2). The racial makeup of the borough was 94.96% White, 2.63% African American, 1.00% Asian, 0.41% from other races, and 1.00% from two or more races. Hispanic or Latino of any race were 1.19% of the population.

There were 1,013 households, out of which 40.8% had children under the age of 18 living with them, 66.2% were married couples living together, 7.1% had a female householder with no husband present, and 24.8% were non-families. 22.0% of all households were made up of individuals, and 12.4% had someone living alone who was 65 years of age or older. The average household size was 2.66 and the average family size was 3.14.

In the borough the population was spread out, with 28.7% under the age of 18, 4.9% from 18 to 24, 23.6% from 25 to 44, 27.9% from 45 to 64, and 15.0% who were 65 years of age or older. The median age was 41 years. For every 100 females, there were 92.2 males. For every 100 females age 18 and over, there were 85.0 males.

The median income for a household in the borough was $90,366, and the median income for a family was $107,089. Males had a median income of $84,912 versus $43,068 for females. The per capita income for the borough was $45,843. About 0.7% of families and 2.4% of the population were below the poverty line, including 1.4% of those under age 18 and 4.1% of those age 65 or over.

Arts and culture

Pennington Day, typically in the middle of May, is an annual event where local organizations and businesses set up booths in a street-fair style on Main Street. The event, with origins back to 1980, features local music and a parade early in the day and festivities continuing into the afternoon.

Government

Local government
Pennington is governed under the Borough form of New Jersey municipal government, which is used in 218 municipalities (of the 564) statewide, making it the most common form of government in New Jersey. The governing body is comprised of a Mayor and a Borough Council, with all positions elected at-large on a partisan basis as part of the November general election. A Mayor is elected directly by the voters to a four-year term of office. The Borough Council is comprised of six members, who are elected to serve three-year terms on a staggered basis, with two seats coming up for election each year in a three-year cycle. The Borough form of government used by Pennington is a "weak mayor / strong council" government in which council members act as the legislative body with the mayor presiding at meetings and voting only in the event of a tie. The mayor can veto ordinances subject to an override by a two-thirds majority vote of the council. The mayor makes committee and liaison assignments for council members, and most appointments are made by the mayor with the advice and consent of the council. The Borough Council has the option to designate an administrator or assign executive responsibilities to the administrator. The Council may also adopt an administrative code which describes how the Council performs its duties.

, the mayor of Pennington is Democrat James Davy, who was elected to serve an unexpired term of office ending December 31, 2023. Members of the Borough Council are Council President Catherine M. "Kit" Chandler (D, 2023), Katrina Angarone (D, 2022; appointed to serve an unexpired term), Deborah L. Gnatt (D, 2024), Ken Gross (D, 2023), Charles "Chico" Marciante (D, 2022) and Nadine Stern (D, 2024).

Katrina Angarone was selected in February 2022 from a list of three names submitted by the Democratic municipal committee to fill the seat expiring in December 2022 that had been held by Beverly Mills until her resignation from office the previous month.

In June 2021, the Borough Council appointed former councilmember James Davy to fill the mayoral seat expiring in December 2023 that became vacant following the resignation of Joseph Lawver earlier that month. Davy served on an interim basis until the November 2021 general election, when he was elected to serve the remainder of the term of office.

In January 2019, Joseph Lawver was appointed to fill the mayoral seat expiring in December 2019 that was vacated by Anthony Persichilli, the borough's longest-serving mayor, when he resigned from office the previous month. Former mayor Persichilli was first elected on November 7, 2006, to fill the vacancy left by the resignation of James Loper. Returned to office at that same election were Democratic council members Joseph Lawver and Eileen Heinzel. James Loper, the previous elected mayor, had resigned from office effective February 1, 2006. The Pennington Republican Committee nominated three candidates to take his place and the Council selected James Benton from the three candidates to fill the vacancy. That same procedure was repeated in December 2006, when the Borough Council selected Diane Zompa to fill the unexpired term left by Persichilli.

Federal, state and county representation
Pennington is located in the 12th Congressional District and is part of New Jersey's 15th state legislative district.

Politics
As of March 2011, there were a total of 2,017 registered voters in Pennington, of which 828 (41.1%) were registered as Democrats, 467 (23.2%) were registered as Republicans and 720 (35.7%) were registered as Unaffiliated. There were 2 voters registered as either Libertarians or Greens.

In the 2012 presidential election, Democrat Barack Obama received 66.0% of the vote (985 cast), ahead of Republican Mitt Romney with 32.7% (488 votes), and other candidates with 1.3% (19 votes), among the 1,653 ballots cast by the borough's 2,115 registered voters (161 ballots were spoiled), for a turnout of 78.2%. In the 2008 presidential election, Democrat Barack Obama received 66.9% of the vote (1,090 cast), ahead of Republican John McCain with 31.0% (506 votes) and other candidates with 1.1% (18 votes), among the 1,630 ballots cast by the borough's 2,088 registered voters, for a turnout of 78.1%. In the 2004 presidential election, Democrat John Kerry received 61.7% of the vote (999 ballots cast), outpolling Republican George W. Bush with 35.9% (581 votes) and other candidates with 0.5% (11 votes), among the 1,619 ballots cast by the borough's 2,022 registered voters, for a turnout percentage of 80.1.

In the 2013 gubernatorial election, Republican Chris Christie received 49.6% of the vote (496 cast), ahead of Democrat Barbara Buono with 48.7% (487 votes), and other candidates with 1.6% (16 votes), among the 1,015 ballots cast by the borough's 2,067 registered voters (16 ballots were spoiled), for a turnout of 49.1%. In the 2009 gubernatorial election, Democrat Jon Corzine received 53.8% of the vote (640 ballots cast), ahead of Republican Chris Christie with 35.7% (425 votes), Independent Chris Daggett with 9.3% (111 votes) and other candidates with 0.3% (3 votes), among the 1,190 ballots cast by the borough's 2,057 registered voters, yielding a 57.9% turnout.

Education

Public school students in pre-kindergarten through twelfth grade attend the Hopewell Valley Regional School District. The comprehensive regional public school district serves students from Hopewell Borough, Hopewell Township and Pennington Borough. As of the 2019–20 school year, the district, comprised of six schools, had an enrollment of 3,467 students and 351.1 classroom teachers (on an FTE basis), for a student–teacher ratio of 9.9:1. Schools in the district (with 2019–20 enrollment data from the National Center for Education Statistics) are 
Bear Tavern Elementary School with 397 students in grades Pre-K–5, 
Hopewell Elementary School with 400 students in grades Pre-K–5, 
Stony Brook Elementary School with 378 students in grades K–5, 
Toll Gate Grammar School with 306 students in grades K–5, 
Timberlane Middle School with 820 students in grades 6–8 and 
Hopewell Valley Central High School with 1,097 students in grades 9–12. The district's Board of Education is composed of nine members allocated to each of the three municipalities based on population, with Pennington assigned a single seat.

Eighth grade students from all of Mercer County are eligible to apply to attend the high school programs offered by the Mercer County Technical Schools, a county-wide vocational school district that offers full-time career and technical education at its Health Sciences Academy, STEM Academy and Academy of Culinary Arts, with no tuition charged to students for attendance.

The Pennington School serves students in sixth through twelfth grades, having been founded in 1838 with a single teacher and three students.

Transportation

Roads and highways

Route 31 passes through Pennington, providing access to Interstate 295 at exit 72. Additionally, exit 73 along I-295 connects to Scotch Road North, which provides access to all of the surrounding Hopewell Township area.

Public transportation
NJ Transit provides bus service between the borough and Trenton on the 624 route.

Points of interest

 Hopewell Valley Central High School
 Hopewell Valley Vineyards
 First Presbyterian Church
 Pennington Railroad Station – Constructed in 1882 by the Reading Railroad, the Victorian-style station is located along the West Trenton Line, on which NJ Transit has plans to offer commuter service, though not at this station. The structure was added to the National Register of Historic Places on December 31, 1974.
 The Pennington School
 Toll Gate Grammar school and the original Central High School.  Both date to the 1920s
Pennington Fire Company

Notable people

People who were born in, residents of, or otherwise closely associated with Pennington include:

 Val Ackerman (born 1959), first president of the Women's National Basketball Association (WNBA), serving from 1996 to 2005. The Central High School's old gymnasium is named after her father, G. Randall Ackerman
 Svetlana Alliluyeva (born 1926), daughter of Joseph Stalin who became an international sensation when she defected to the United States in 1967
 Kwame Anthony Appiah (born 1954), philosopher
 Frank Baldwin (1880–1959), Rear admiral in the United States Navy
 Nicole Baxter (born 1994), professional soccer player who plays as a midfielder for the National Women's Soccer League club Sky Blue FC
 Peter Benchley (1940–2006), author of the novel and film Jaws
 Wendy Benchley (born 1941), marine and environmental conservation advocate and former councilwoman from New Jersey who was the wife of author Peter Benchley
 Grant Billmeier (born 1984), former center for the Seton Hall University Pirates men's basketball team
 Bob Bradley (born 1958), current head coach of Los Angeles FC, former head coach of the United States national football team and Egypt national football team
 Michael Bradley (born 1987), son of former US Men's National Soccer Team coach Bob Bradley and professional soccer player who currently plays for Toronto F.C. in Major League Soccer
 Anne Canby, transportation official who served in the cabinet of Governor Brendan Byrne as the New Jersey Commissioner of Transportation from 1981 to 1982 and in the cabinet of Governor Thomas R. Carper as the Delaware Secretary of Transportation from 1993 to 2001
 Simon Carcagno (born 1976), American professional rower
 George Councell (born 1949), 11th bishop of the Episcopal Diocese of New Jersey, serving in the position from 2003 to 2013
 James Davy, former New Jersey Commissioner of Human Services
 Lucille Davy, former Commissioner of the New Jersey Department of Education
 Tony DeNicola (1927–2006), jazz drummer
 Olga Gorelli (1920–2006), composer and pianist
 Jim Himes (born 1966), U.S. Representative from Connecticut's 4th congressional district
 Cassidy Hutchinson (born 1996 or 1997), former aide to White House Chief of Staff Mark Meadows during the Trump administration who testified at a hearing of the United States House Select Committee on the January 6 Attack. In town, she was a member of the Youth Advisory Committee and was awarded the Mayor's Award for Outstanding Civic Contribution. At Hopewell Valley Central High School, she was a member of the girl's track team
 Samuel Messick (1931–1998), psychologist who worked for the Educational Testing Service
 Kenneth G. Miller (born 1956), geologist at Rutgers University who has written and lectured on global warming and sea level change
 Elizabeth Maher Muoio, member of the New Jersey General Assembly who served as a councilwoman from 1997 to 2001
 Sue Niederer, political activist
 Judith Persichilli (born 1949), nurse and health care executive who has served as the Commissioner of the New Jersey Department of Health
 William E. Schluter (1927–2018), politician who served in the New Jersey General Assembly and State Senate
 John Tanguay (born 1998), rower who won a silver medal at the 2019 World Rowing Championships
 Karl Weidel (1923–1997), member of the New Jersey General Assembly

References

External links

 
1890 establishments in New Jersey
Borough form of New Jersey government
Boroughs in Mercer County, New Jersey
Populated places established in 1890